Arahata may refer to:

 Arahata Station, a metro station in Nagoya, Japan
 Arihant (Jainism), a philosophical concept
 Kanson Arahata (1887–1981), Japanese labor leader, politician and writer
 Arahat(ta), Pali, a full awakened person, "Perfect One".

See also
 Arahata Fuji Shrine, Tokorozawa, Japan